Ahmedabad Defenders is a men's volleyball team from Ahmedabad, Gujarat playing in the Prime Volleyball League in India. The team was founded in 2018 and owned by Bonhomie Sports. The team had participated in the only season of the dissolved Pro Volleyball League in 2019 before it switched to Prime Volleyball League in 2021.

Honors
 Prime Volleyball League
 Runners-up: 2022
 Prime Volleyball League
 Winner: 2023

Team

Current team

Administration and support staff

References 

Volleyball in India
Men's volleyball teams
Sports clubs in India
Sport in Ahmedabad